William Arnold Carter (June 27, 1907 – May 18, 1996) was the Governor of the Panama Canal Zone from 1960 to 1962.

Biography
He was born in Corsicana, Texas on June 27, 1907 to William Arnold Carter and Susan Young.

He graduated from the United States Military Academy at West Point in 1930.  In 1933 he earned a B.S. in civil engineering from University of California.  His World War II service included being chief engineer of the II Corps in the Mediterranean, and chief engineer of the 1st Army during the Normandy Invasion and European Campaign. He served as Panama Canal Zone Governor from 1960 to 1962.

He died on May 18, 1996 in Washington, D.C.

References

United States Military Academy alumni
Governors of the Panama Canal Zone
1907 births
1996 deaths